The Tunisia national football team represents Tunisia in men's international association football. The team is a member of both FIFA and CAF, the Confederation of African Football. It is governed by the Tunisian Football Federation, founded in 1957. Colloquially known as the Eagles of Carthage, the team's colours are red and white, and the bald eagle is its symbol. Most of Tunisia's home matches are played at the Stade Olympique de Radès in Radès since 2001. Jalel Kadri has been coaching the team since 30 January 2022.

Tunisia is one of the most competitive African national teams in international football, having won one African Cup of Nations, as hosts in 2004. They have made six FIFA World Cups and twenty Africa Cup of Nations tournaments, and participated in four editions of the Olympic football tournaments.

History

1928–1956: Early years
An unofficial Tunisian team was formed in 1928, comprising the best Tunisian players from the Tunisian league. The team's first match was on 11 March 1928, against the French B team; Tunisia lost 8–2. Their next friendlies, against the same team on 23 March 1930 and 26 March 1933, also resulted in heavy defeats, 0–5 and 1–6 respectively. Tunisia had to wait until 1932 for their first match win, a 1–0 victory over French Algeria.

Most of the matches that Tunisia played in the 1930s and '40s were against French teams, whether it was French Algeria, the French military team or the France B team, at the Stade Vélodrome in Tunis.

1956–78: Post-independence

Tunisia gained independence from France on 20 March 1956. The Tunisian Football Federation was founded on 29 March 1957 and the Tunisian team played a match with Austrian club FC Admira Wacker Mödling on 30 December of the same year and managed to win 4–1. Tunisia became affiliated with FIFA and the Confederation of African Football in 1960. The independent Tunisia played their first match against Algeria on 1 June 1957, in the midst of the Algerian War; Tunisia lost 2–1. They played their first official match at the 1957 Pan Arab Games where they won against Libya 4–3 after scoring the first Tunisian goal in an official competition by Farzit. They also managed to get through Iraq and Lebanon before losing in the final against Syria 3–1.

In 1960, Yugoslavian Milan Kristić became the first foreign manager; the national team qualified for the 1960 Summer Olympics, their first international event after beating Malta, Morocco and Sudan; on 24 July 1960, the team experienced its biggest-ever defeat, losing 10–1 against Hungary. However, less than a month later, on 18 August, Tunisia recorded their biggest-ever win: an 8–1 thumping of Taiwan. In the Olympic Games, the team suffered three defeats: against Poland 6–1, Argentina 2–1 and Denmark 3–1.

Frane Matošić was appointed as the second Yugoslav coach of Tunisia after Kristić led Tunisia to qualify for the Olympics. In 1962, Tunisia entered the African Cup of Nations qualifiers for the first time: the team qualified for the tournament after overcoming Morocco and Nigeria and went on to finish third after beating Uganda in the third-place match. The team won the 1963 Arab Cup, after winning against Syria, Jordan, Lebanon and Kuwait. 

Tunisia also qualified for the 1963 Africa Cup of Nations, and CAF decided that Tunisia would host the 1965 AFCON, making the final after beating Ethiopia 4–0 in the opening match in Stade Chedly Zouiten, losing 3–2 to Ghana in extra-time of the final. Despite this early success, Tunisia did not enter the Cup of Nations again until 1976, and qualify until 1978. In 1973, the team entered the Palestine Cup of Nations and won in dominant fashion, winning all six of their matches overcoming Syria, Egypt, Palestine, Yemen and Iraq, scoring 19 goals, and conceding only three.

1978: Golden generation
In February 1975, after a short stint with Hungarian manager André Nagy, Abdelmajid Chetali was hired. Tunisia qualified for their FIFA World Cup debut in 1978 after a remarkable performance in the qualifiers led by a distinguished generation with Mokhtar Dhouib, Néjib Ghommidh, Raouf Ben Aziza and Tarak Dhiab. Tunisia defeated Mexico 3–1, but were defeated by Poland 1–0, and drew scoreless against defending champion West Germany.

1978–1994: Decline 

Following their first World Cup, Tunisia experienced a decline; between 1980 and 1992, the team managed to qualify for only two tournaments – the 1982 African Cup of Nations and the 1988 Summer Olympics – in both, they were knocked out in the first round. They, however, reached the last round of the 1986 World Cup qualifiers by beating Nigeria before being defeated by Algeria. Former Cameroon manager Jean Vincent was hired but failed to qualify for the 1988 African Cup in Morocco after a defeat against Algeria. He also achieved catastrophic results in the African Games with defeats against Cameroon, Madagascar and Kenya, and was immediately sacked.

Taoufik Ben Othman, assistant manager in 1978, improved Tunisia's results relatively as they qualified for the Olympic Games after surpassing Morocco and Egypt in the qualifiers. However, he was sacked days before the start of the competition after poor results in the 1988 Arab Cup and failure to win in their matches against Saudi Arabia, Lebanon, Egypt and Iraq, as well as friendlies against Malta, Finland and East Germany.

Polish manager Antoni Piechniczek was temporarily appointed and supervised the team in the first round of World Cup qualifiers 1990 and also in the finals of the Olympic Games; in the latter, Tunisia tied China 0–0 and Sweden 2–2 and suffered a defeat from West Germany 4–1. Mokhtar Tlili was appointed manager, however, he still missed the African Cup in 1990 after a defeat to Senegal. Piechniczek came back but still did not qualify for the 1990 World Cup. Despite missing the 1992 African Cup, the federation renewed confidence in him because of the respectable performance he had given in the qualifiers; an early exit from the World Cup qualifiers for 1994 contributed to his dismissal after a draw with Morocco. Youssef Zouaoui replaced him; Tunisia hosted the 1994 African Cup of Nations replacing original hosts Zaire, but finished at the bottom of the group, after a 2–0 loss to Mali and a draw with Zaire.

1994–2002: Resurgence
Henryk Kasperczak became the new manager after Tunisia hosted the 1994 African Cup of Nations. Tunisia qualified for the 1996 AFCON and finished second in their group, putting them through to the quarter-finals. Tunisia went on to beat Gabon in the quarter-finals and Zambia in the semi-finals, to reach their first major final in 31 years, but lost to host country South Africa 2–0.

Tunisia reached the quarter-finals of the 1998 African Cup of Nations in the lead of the group with a win over DR Congo, Togo and a defeat from Ghana, where they were eliminated in a penalty shootout by host country Burkina Faso.  The team also qualified for that year's World Cup after a 20-year absence: they again failed to advance from the group stages, losing 2–0 to England and 1–0 to Colombia, and drawing 1–1 with Romania. Kasperczak was sacked and replaced with Francesco Scoglio, who guided the team to the 2000 African Cup of Nations, where they finished in fourth place after losing to Cameroon in the semi-finals.

The following year, Scoglio departed to rejoin Genoa CFC, sparking a period of severe instability. Eckhard Krautzun initially took over and guided the team to a second successive World Cup qualification, but then resigned, citing interference from the Tunisian FA with his coaching. Henri Michel replaced him, but was sacked when Tunisia crashed out of the 2002 African Cup of Nations without scoring a single goal after scoreless draws with Senegal and Zambia and a defeat from Egypt. Finally, Ammar Souayah took over in time for the 2002 World Cup; the team drew in friendlies with Norway and South Korea and were defeated by Denmark and Slovenia. In the finals, Tunisia exited the tournament in the group stage, drawing 1–1 with Belgium, losing 2–0 to Russia and co-hosts Japan, prompting a search for a new manager.

2002–2008: Roger Lemerre era, African domination

In September 2002, the Tunisian Football Federation announced that it was finalizing a contract with former France manager Roger Lemerre. Tunisia hosted the 2004 African Cup of Nations, winning the group. They defeated Senegal in the quarter-finals, and Nigeria in the semi-finals. Tunisia built a 1–0 lead after four minutes with Mehdi Nafti's concentration pushed by Francileudo Santos, before Morocco levelled. Tunisia restored their lead, giving them their first African Cup of Nations title. They also won the CAF's African National Team of the Year award. Lemerre became the first manager to win two different continental tournaments, having previously won Euro 2000 with France.

As a result, Tunisia qualified for the 2005 FIFA Confederations Cup in Germany, playing the hosts, Argentina and Australia. The only points they would win was a victory over Australia. Before their 2006 World Cup appearance, Lemerre took the Tunisians to a training camp in Switzerland, where they played international friendlies against Swiss clubs. Tunisia would only record one draw in Germany, against Saudi Arabia, losing against Spain and Ukraine.

Hatem Trabelsi announced his retirement from international football after eight years, and Lemerre led Tunisia to the 2008 African Cup of Nations. Tunisia won their 2008 AFCON group after a draw in the opening match against Senegal 2–2, a 3–1 victory over South Africa, and a goalless draw against Angola. They then lost against Cameroon 3–2 in extra time.

2008–2014: Disappointments 

Portuguese Humberto Coelho was appointed as the new manager on 3 June 2008. Coelho would fail to qualify for the 2010 World Cup. Faouzi Benzarti was appointed as the new manager, and was also sacked after Tunisia were eliminated from the group stage in the 2010 Africa Cup of Nations. In June 2010, Bertrand Marchand was appointed manager for a two-year contract. After a series of horrendous results, Tunisia fell to 65th in the FIFA World Rankings, the worst in its history. Sami Trabelsi was appointed, and the team qualified for the 2012 Africa Cup of Nations, where they were eliminated in the quarter-finals after a defeat by Ghana.

In the 2013 Africa Cup of Nations, Tunisia snatched a late winner against Algeria, before a defeat by Ivory Coast, 3–0. The last match ended with a 1–1 draw against Togo. In February 2013, Nabil Maâloul replaced Sami Trabelsi; in their first two 2014 FIFA World Cup qualifications, Tunisia beat Sierra Leone 2–1 and clinched a 2–2 draw in Freetown.

On 16 June, during the fifth round of the group stage, Tunisia tied 1–1 against Equatorial Guinea. A 2–0 loss to Cape Verde on 7 September all but eliminated Tunisia; however, Tunisia advanced after FIFA disqualified Cape Verde for cheating. They would then be knocked out by Cameroon.

2014–present: Resurgence again
Belgian manager Georges Leekens was appointed in early 2014; early results included a 1–1 draw against Colombia and a 1–0 win over South Korea, both in friendly matches. Under Leekens, the team climbed from 49th to 22nd in the FIFA rankings. Tunisia qualified for the 2015 African Cup of Nations, and topped their group for the first time since 2008, winning against Zambia and drawing with Cape Verde and DR Congo. They were eliminated in the quarter-finals after a defeat to host Equatorial Guinea. In July 2015, Henryk Kasperczak returned as manager after 17 years. He managed to qualify the team for the 2017 African Cup, and reached the quarter-finals of the competition after beating Algeria and Zimbabwe, before losing again in this round, this time against Burkina Faso.

On 27 April 2017, Nabil Maâloul returned as manager despite the disapproval of the Tunisian supporters following the failure at the 2014 World Cup qualifiers, but this time he qualified Tunisia for the 2018 FIFA World Cup in Russia. Tunisia's qualification for the World Cup and its results in friendlies against Iran and Costa Rica, led to its rise to 14th place in the FIFA World Rankings, their best ever. Before the World Cup, Tunisia drew with Turkey and Portugal, in addition to a narrow defeat against Spain 1–0. Despite this, in the World Cup, Tunisia were once again eliminated from the group stage. In the first match, England won 2–1. Belgium defeated the North Africans 5–2, and in Tunisia's last game against Panama, the Arab nation won 2–1. Tunisia qualified for the 2019 Africa Cup of Nations with new manager Alain Giresse; the new manager would only record three ties, against Angola, Mali, and Mauritania to qualify for the round 16. They eventually would win against Ghana, and Madagascar 3–0 in the quarter-finals, to qualify for the semi-finals for the first time in 15 years, losing to Senegal 1–0 in extra time. In September 2021, the national team began its 2022 FIFA World Cup qualification campaign with three consecutive victories against Equatorial Guinea, Zambia,  and Mauritania; they would then draw Mauritania 0–0 and lose against Equatorial Guinea 1–0, to advance for the third round on the top of the group.

Qatar hosted the 2021 FIFA Arab Cup; Tunisia started with a 5–1 win against Mauritania. They then suffered an unexpected defeat to Syria, before winning against the United Arab Emirates. In the quarter-finals Tunisia won against Oman 2–1, and scored a 95th minute winner against Egypt in the semi-finals. Tunisia faced Algeria in the final, losing 2–0. The 2021 Africa Cup of Nations was postponed to early 2022; in the group stage, Tunisia began with a 1–0 defeat against Mali, with Zambian referee Janny Sikazwe ending the match in the 85th minute. In the second match, the team achieved a 4–0 victory over Mauritania, and lost against Gambia in the last group match. Tunisia defeated Nigeria in the round of 16, and were eliminated by Burkina Faso.

In March, Tunisia qualified for their sixth World Cup, the 2022 tournament in Qatar, the first hosted by an Arab nation, after beating Mali 1–0 on aggregate, taking revenge for the earlier loss in the AFCON. They then defeated Chile and Japan to win the 2022 Kirin Cup Soccer title for the first time, and Ferjani Sassi was named the best player of the tournament while his compatriot Issam Jebali finished as the top scorer with two goals. Tunisia played two pre-World Cup friendlies in France in September 2022, defeating Comoros 1−0 in Croissy-sur-Seine  and losing 5−1 to Brazil at the Parc des Princes in Paris. With the exception of Brazil, Tunisia's relatively good forms increased confidence on the side to break the knockout stage taboo as Tunisia found themselves grouped with world champions France, European dark horse Denmark and Asian minnows Australia. 

In Group D, Tunisia drew Euro 2020 semi-finalists Denmark 0−0 in a rather decent display by the African side. But a 0−1 loss against Australia followed, severely hampering Tunisia's odds to progress. A 1−0 victory over France courtesy of a goal from Wahbi Khazri was not enough to seal Tunisia's place in the last 16 as Australia's Mathew Leckie goal against Denmark meant the Asian representative placed second.

Home stadium

From 1956 to 2001, the national stadium was Chedly Zouiten Stadium, with a capacity of 18,000. It hosted also the 1965 and 1994 African Cup of Nations and the 1977 FIFA U-20 World Cup before it was replaced after the construction of El Menzah Stadium (45,000) in 1967 for the 1967 Mediterranean Games. Tunisia's first match at the stadium was played on 8 September 1967 against Libya. It hosted the 1977 FIFA World Youth Championship and was completely renovated for the 1994 African Cup of Nations. It also hosted the 2004 AFCON.

In 2001, Stade 7 November was inaugurated as Tunisia's national stadium ahead of the 2001 Mediterranean Games. Located in Radès, the stadium has an all-seater capacity of 60,000. The first match at the stadium was played on 7 July 2001 against between Étoile du Sahel and CS Hammam-Lif for the Tunisian Cup final. Tunisia have used the stadium for almost every major home game, including the 2004 African Cup of Nations Final. The Tunisians often host their matches at the Stade Mustapha Ben Jannet in Monastir which has a capacity of 20,000.

In addition, there are many other venues that host games, such as the Olympic Stadium of Sousse, which hosted a friendly match between Tunisia and Switzerland in November 2012 and also hosted a match in the 2012 AFCON qualification.

Rivalries

Tunisia's main football rivals are its neighbours Algeria, Morocco, and Egypt, with which it shares close cultural and political relations. 

Tunisia have played 45 games against Algeria. After the independence of Algeria, a friendly match took place at the Stade Chedly Zouiten. The teams also met three times in the qualifying phase of the World Cup in 1970, 1978 and 1986. The overall record slightly favours the Algerians with 16 wins, 14 draws and 14 losses. Algeria and Tunisia played three times in official competitions: twice in the Africa Cup of Nations, in 2013 and 2017, which Tunisia won both times, and once in the FIFA Arab Cup in 2021, which Algeria won.

The rivalry between Egypt and Tunisia is one of Africa's best and most exciting matches for their long continental history. The two teams have met 39 times in both official and friendly matches. The overall record is slightly favourable to the Tunisians, who won 16 matches against Egypt's 12. 11 matches ended in a draw.

Tunisia and Morocco have played 50 games since their independence from France in 1956. Their first match was for the 1962 World Cup qualification, which took place on 30 October 1960 in Casablanca. Most of the matches were played in World Cup qualification as they met in the qualifiers of 1962, 1970, 1978, 1990, 1994 and 2006. They also met four times in the African Cup of Nations. Two of them ended in a draw in 1978 and 2000 and the other two matches ended up as a Tunisian win in the 2004 and 2012 AFCONs.

Team image

Supporters

Fans of the Tunisian national team display the country's national flag, usually with an emphasis on the red element.

Kits and crest
Six companies have supplied sports uniforms to the Tunisian national team, starting in 1970, when Adidas began to adopt the Tunisian national team's uniforms for 24 years. Italy's Lotto provided Tunisia's until 1998, and Uhlsport has supplied the Tunisian team as well. From 2002 to 2011, Puma provided the Tunisian national football team kits. In 2019, the Italian company Kappa began making them.

Kit manufacturer

Results and fixtures 

The following is a list of match results from the previous 12 months, as well as any future matches that have been scheduled.

2023

Current staff

Players

Current squad
The following players were called up for the 2023 Africa Cup of Nations qualification fixtures against Libya on 24 and 28 March 2023.

Information correct as of 30 November 2022, after the match against France.

Recent call-ups
The following players have also been called up to the Tunisia squad within the last twelve months.

INJ Player withdrew from the squad due to an injury.
PRE Preliminary squad.
SUS Player is serving a suspension.
WD Player withdrew for personal reasons.

Player records

Competitive record

FIFA World Cup 

Tunisia have appeared in the finals of the FIFA World Cup on six occasions, the first in 1978 where they finished ninth of 16. Between 1998 and 2006 they qualified for three straight World Cups, and wouldn't qualify again until 2018. However, Tunisia have never advanced from the group stage.

Africa Cup of Nations 

Tunisia have participated in the African Cup of Nations 20 times and holds the record for the number of consecutive participations with 15 between 1994 and 2021. In 1965, Tunisia hosted the competition, as they reached the final and lost the title to Ghana 2–3 after extra time. In 1996, the team reached the final for the second time, but was defeated by hosts South Africa 0–2. They didn't win it all until 2004.

FIFA Confederations Cup 

Tunisia qualified for the FIFA Confederations Cup on one occasion, a sole appearance in 2005, after winning the 2004 AFCON. They only managed to win against Australia 2–0.

African Nations Championship 

Tunisia have participated in two editions of the African Nations Championship, winning it in 2011 and reaching the quarter-finals in 2016.

FIFA Arab Cup 
In 1963 Tunisia won the first edition of the Arab Nations Cup, played only in a group stage. Tunisia won all four matches and finished at the top. They exited in the group stage in 1988.

The 2021 FIFA Arab Cup was the first version of the tournament under FIFA, with Tunisia reaching the final finishing behind Algeria.

Mediterranean Games 
Tunisia participated in the football tournament in the Mediterranean Games 12 times, first in 1963 in Naples, Italy. Tunisia reached the final twice, in the 1971 edition in Izmir, Turkey and in 2001 in Tunis.

Minor Tournaments

Other records

Head-to-head record

FIFA rankings 
Tunisia's FIFA rankings have ranged from 65 in July 2010, to 14 in April 2018.

Rankings by year 
Below is a chart of Tunisia's FIFA ranking since 1993.

Honours

This is a list of honours for the senior Tunisia national team

Official competitions 
 Africa Cup of Nations
  Champions: 2004
  Runner-up: 1965, 1996
  Third-place: 1962

African Nations Championship
  Champions: 2011

FIFA Arab Cup
  Champions: 1963
  Runner-up: 2021

Mediterranean Games
   Gold Medal: 2001
  Silver Medal: 1971
  Bronze Medal: 1975, 2013

African Games
  Silver Medal: 1991
  Bronze Medal: 2007

Pan Arab Games
  Silver Medal: 1957

Friendly competitions

7th November Cup
  Champions: 1991, 1993, 1995

Catalonia International Trophy
  Champions: 2011, 2016

Kirin Cup Soccer
  Champions: 2022

Palestine Cup of Nations
  Champions: 1973

LG Cup
  Champions: 1997
  Runner-up: 2006

Kirin Challenge Cup
  Runner-up: 2015

Kuneitra Cup
  Third-place: 1974

Minor tournaments

Tripoli Fair Tournament
  Champions: 1965
  Third-place: 1962

Tunis Four Nations Tournament
  Champions: 2003

Friendship Games
  Runner-up: 1963
  Third-place: 1984–85

Malta International Tournament
  Third-place: 1994

Awards 
African National Team of the Year

 First place : 1995, 1999, 2004, 2005
 Second place : 1996, 1997

See also
 Tunisian Football Federation
 Tunisia A' national football team
 Tunisia national under-23 football team
 Tunisia national under-20 football team
 Tunisia national under-17 football team
 Tunisia national under-15 football team
 Tunisia women's national football team
 Tunisia women's national under-20 football team
 Tunisia women's national under-17 football team

Other football codes
 Tunisia national minifootball team
 Tunisia national futsal team
 Tunisia national beach soccer team
 Tunisia national American football team

Notes

References

Titles chronology

External links

 
FIFA profile
Tunisia national football team

 
African national association football teams
T